Asura humilis is a moth of the  family Erebidae. It is found in India, Burma and on Java.

References

humilis
Moths described in 1854
Moths of Asia